Paderno del Grappa is a small town and a frazione of Pieve del Grappa in the province of Treviso, Veneto region of Italy.. Paderno del Grappa is located at the base of Mount Grappa, a mountain located in the Dolomites.

History
Paderno del Grappa was a separate comune (municipality) until 30 January 2019, when it was merged with Crespano del Grappa to form a new comune.

Twin towns
Paderno del Grappa is twinned with:

  Mallersdorf-Pfaffenberg, Germany, since 1990

References

External links
 Paderno del Grappa Official Website 
 Istituti Filippin Official Website
 CIMBA Italy Website

Cities and towns in Veneto